Xenichthys is a genus of grunts native to the eastern Pacific Ocean.

Species
The currently recognized species in this genus are:
 Xenichthys agassizii Steindachner,  1876
 Xenichthys rupestris Hildebrand, 1946
 Xenichthys xanti T. N. Gill, 1863 (longfin salema)

References

Haemulinae